Abubakar M. Gana is the current director of the National Examinations Council (NECO) in Nigeria. NECO is a government agency responsible for the administration and supervision of various national and international examinations in Nigeria, including the Senior Secondary School Certificate Examination (SSSCE) and the National Common Entrance Examination (NCEE).

Gana was appointed as the director of NECO in 2019. Prior to this, he had served as the deputy director of NECO, as well as the director of operations and planning.

During his tenure as director of NECO, Gana has implemented a number of reforms and improvements to the examination process. These have included the introduction of biometric fingerprinting to prevent cheating, the expansion of NECO's online services, and the introduction of a new grading system. He has also worked to improve the quality of NECO's examinations and to increase the transparency and accountability of the organization

Education 
He holds a bachelor's degree in Science in Psychology from Nasarawa State University, as well as a Masters of Law Enforcement and Criminal Justice from university Ahmadu Bello University in 2013, furthermore He has a Post Graduate Diploma, M.Ed and PhD in view in Guidance and Counselling from Bayero University Kano.

References 

Nigerian directors
Nigerian government officials
1987 births
All Progressives Congress politicians
Living people
Nigerian Muslims
People from Nasarawa State
Nigerian Fula people
Nigerian businesspeople
University and college founders
Founders of Nigerian schools and colleges
Nigerian philanthropists
Nigerian company founders